Mustache is a 2023 Pakistani-American comedy-drama film written and directed by Imran J. Khan and starring Atharva Verma and Alicia Silverstone.

Cast
Atharva Verma as Ilyas
Alicia Silverstone 
Rizwan Manji as Hameed
Meesha Shafi
Ayana Manji as Yasmeen
Melody Cao
Krishna Manivannan as Arun
Hasan Minhaj

Release
The film premiered at South by Southwest on March 12, 2023.

Reception
Mimi Calzada of The Daily Texan gave the film a positive review and wrote, "Mustache makes for an outstanding directorial feature debut from Imran Khan, which hugely benefits from Verma’s charming and endearing performance. Easily relatable, laugh-out-loud funny and downright delightful, Mustache solidifies itself as one of the best films in the SXSW 2023 lineup."

Justin Lowe of The Hollywood Reporter also gave the film a positive review and wrote, "A religion-themed comedy can be a tricky proposition, even if the tone is predominantly respectful, but Khan strikes a satisfying balance between satire and deference that’s enjoyable without excessively pushing boundaries."

References

External links